Everyday Rewards, formerly Woolworths Rewards, is a customer loyalty program owned and operated in Australia by Woolworths Group. Members can earn points in the program from Woolworths Group companies (Woolworths Supermarkets, Big W, BWS, etc), as well as partner brands like Ampol, Bupa and Origin Energy. Qantas Frequent Flyer program members can convert 2,000 Everyday Rewards points to 1,000 Frequent Flyer points as part of a partnership between the two companies.

, Everyday Rewards claims to have 12.5 million members. Members can access their Everyday Rewards card through the app, by adding it to digital wallets like Google Wallet, or by ordering a physical card online. Accrued points can then by redeemed at Woolworths Group stores (at a rate of 2,000 points for an  discount), or converted to 1,000 Qantas Frequent Flyer points. Spending  or more in a Woolworths Supermarket also gives a 4c/litre fuel discount voucher at participating Ampol or EG Australia branded outlets.

History 
Everyday Rewards was first trialled in Central West, New South Wales from September 2007. This followed Woolworths' announcement that it was planning to launch a general purpose credit card in 2008, the Everyday Money credit card.

During the NSW trial, 50,000 cards were issued to customers. In February 2008, Woolworths announced that following the NSW trial, Everyday Rewards would be rolled out nationally, beginning with South Australia and the Northern Territory in mid-February, and to other states by the end of May 2008.

By early May 2008, the scheme had been extended to Victoria, Western Australia and Queensland and by the end of May 2008 to all mainland states (excluding Woolworths and BWS stores in Tasmania.). Woolworths stated in June 2008 that "well over a million" shoppers had taken a card and registered their details. In July 2008, Woolworths stated that the program had exceeded expectations, with more than three million cards on issue. By August 2008, there were 3.8 million cards "on issue", with 2.4 million cards "registered".

By June 2010, Big W had withdrawn the fuel discount benefit for cardholders in Western Australia and South Australia, and in August 2010, Big W also withdrew from the fuel discount benefit for cardholders to all of Australia (except Tasmania).

In May 2012, Woolworths started offering in-store discounts to Everyday Rewards members who use the card.

On 26 October 2015 Woolworths announced that, from 1 January 2016, customer loyalty cards would no longer earn Qantas Frequent Flyer points. Instead they will receive more discounts on groceries. The new discount program came into effect on 28 October 2015.  Everyday Rewards cardholders will be sent new 'Woolworths Rewards' cards. The furore over this new program caused Woolworths to do an about-face and offering their customers the choice of redeeming their Woolworths Rewards for Qantas points.

In April 2016, doubts were expressed over the effectiveness of the new program with claims by analysts that the program has not gained traction in the community and is possibly a cause of the slow down in supermarket sales growth which has slowed to 3 per cent. On 22 August 2016, significant improvements to Woolworths Rewards were announced. As of 31 August 2016, members will earn rewards on every dollar they spend in Woolworths' Supermarkets and BWS stores, and for the first time, members will also earn on every dollar they spend at EG Australia outlets.

On 29 July 2020, Woolworths Rewards rebranded as Everyday Rewards. Everyday Rewards was launched in Tasmania on 6 August 2020 replacing the Frequent Shopper Club loyalty program in the state which would be phased out by 2021. The Frequent Shopper Club was Purity Supermarket's loyalty program which Woolworths retained after its purchase of the chain due to an arrangement with Purity and because of its popularity.

Qantas Frequent Flyer program
In December 2008, Woolworths and Qantas entered into a six-year agreement to allow Everyday Rewards members to earn Qantas Frequent Flyer (QFF) points for purchases at Woolworths supermarkets. In June 2009, details of the arrangement were announced. Under the arrangement Everyday Rewards members would earn one Qantas Frequent Flyer point for each dollar over $30 spent in one transaction at Woolworths (or Safeway) supermarkets (excluding Tasmania) or Woolworths liquor stores. To earn these points Everyday Rewards members would need to also have and link a QFF account, and the QFF joining fees were waived for new QFF members. Woolworths was to pay the QFF program for QFF points earned by members under the arrangement.

The program was later expanded to include some of Woolworths Limited's other stores including Big W and BWS. From October 2009, cardholders could collect one point per dollar for every dollar over $50 spent in one transaction at Dick Smith and Tandy, however those stores' participation stopped in September 2012.

In August 2009, of 3.8 million Everyday Rewards cards "registered", 1.2 million were linked to a QFF account, which increased by August 2010, to 5.1 million cards registered, of which 2.7 million were linked to a QFF account.

On 26 October 2015, Woolworths announced it is splitting with Qantas to revamp its Everyday Rewards Program.

On 15 December 2015, Woolworths Rewards announced a new partnership with Qantas Frequent Flyer giving customers the choice to convert their Woolworths Dollars, earned through buying orange ticket products, into Qantas Points at a conversion rate of 870 Qantas Points for every 10 Woolworths Dollars.

On 22 August 2016, Woolworths Rewards announced that members would now have additional redemption options, including converting their savings to Qantas Points.

On 1 October 2019, Woolworths Rewards increased the rate at which points are converted to Qantas Frequent Flyer points. Instead of 2,000 Woolworths Rewards points converting to 870 Qantas points, this increased to 1,000 Qantas points. Upon reaching 2,000 Woolworths Rewards points, those points would now be converted within 24 hours (rather than in blocks every 3 months).

See also 
 Flybuys, the loyalty program run by the competing Coles Group and Wesfarmers

References

External links 
 Everyday Rewards

Customer loyalty programs in Australia
Woolworths Group (Australia)